The Mansudae People's Theatre is a theatre near to the Mansudae Assembly Hall in Pyongyang, North Korea. It was opened in 2012.

See also 
 List of theatres in North Korea
 Mansudae Art Theatre
 Mansudae Art Studio

References 

Theatres in North Korea
Theatres completed in 2012
Buildings and structures in Pyongyang
2012 establishments in North Korea